"Shine" is a song by the British heavy metal band Motörhead taken from the Another Perfect Day album and released in 1983 on 7" and 12" vinyl. The B-side is "(I'm Your) Hoochie Coochie Man", recorded live at Sheffield University and Manchester Apollo on 9 June/10 June 1983. The 12" vinyl had a bonus track, a live version of "Don't Need Religion" from Manchester. Both B-sides appear as bonus tracks on the CD reissue of Another Perfect Day.

Track listing

7"
 "Shine" (Ian Kilmister, Phil Taylor, Brian Robertson)
 "(I'm Your) Hoochie Coochie Man" (live) (Willie Dixon)

12"
 "Shine" (Kilmister, Taylor, Robertson)
 "(I'm Your) Hoochie Coochie Man" (live) (Dixon)
 "(Don't Need) Religion" (live) (Kilmister, Eddie Clarke, Taylor)

Personnel
 Guitars, piano – Brian "Robbo" Robertson
 Drums – Phil "Philthy Animal" Taylor
 Bass, lead vocals – Lemmy (Ian Kilmister) 
 Sleeve Illustration and design: Polly Productions / Tony
 Photographs: Simon Porter / Fin Costello

References

External links
 Sample of the song at the Motörhead Official Site (RealPlayer required).

Motörhead songs
1983 singles
Songs written by Phil Taylor (musician)
Songs written by Lemmy
Songs written by Brian Robertson (guitarist)
1983 songs
Bronze Records singles
EMI Records singles